
AD 47 (XLVII) was a common year starting on Sunday (link will display the full calendar) of the Julian calendar. At the time, it was known as the Year of the Consulship of Claudius and Vitellius (or, less frequently, year 800 Ab urbe condita). The denomination AD 47 for this year has been used since the early medieval period, when the Anno Domini calendar era became the prevalent method in Europe for naming years.

Events

By place

Roman Empire 
 Claudius revives the censorship and ludi saeculares, and organises the order of the Haruspices, with 60 members.
 Gnaeus Domitius Corbulo is made commander of the Roman army in Germania Inferior. He conquers the Chauci and fights against the Cherusci and Frisians.
 Cauci pirates led by the Roman deserter Gannascus ravage the Gallic coast; Corbulo uses the Rhine fleet against them. The Frisian revolt is suppressed.
 Publius Ostorius Scapula replaces Aulus Plautius as governor of Britain. The south-east of the island is now a Roman province, while certain states on the south coast are ruled as a nominally independent client kingdom by Tiberius Claudius Cogidubnus, whose seat is probably at Fishbourne near Chichester. Ostorius immediately faces incursions from unconquered areas, which he puts down.
 Corbulo orders the construction of the canal Fossa Corbulonis, between the Rhine and Meuse in the Netherlands, which connects the city Forum Hadriani (Voorburg).
 Romans build the Traiectum fortification near the mouth of the Rhine, which will later grow to be the city of Utrecht.
 Claudius founds the city Forum Claudii Vallensium (modern Martigny) in the Alpes Poeninae (Switzerland).

By topic

Religion 
 Ananias becomes high priest in Judaea.
 Paul starts his evangelistic work (first missionary journey), accompanied by Barnabas and Mark.
</onlyinclude>

Births 
 Taejodae, Korean ruler of Goguryeo (d. 165)

Deaths 
 Decimus Valerius Asiaticus, Roman politician and consul
 Gaius Sallustius Crispus Passienus, Roman consul
 Gnaeus Pompeius Magnus, Roman nobleman 
 Quintus Sanquinius Maximus, Roman politician
 Vardanes I, king of the Parthian Empire

References 

0047

als:40er#47